The Tongan National Rugby League (or for sponsorship reasons the TNRL Global Insurance Cup) is the major rugby league cup for semi-professional clubs in Tonga. Currently there are nineteen teams in the cup (12 in the first, 7 in the second) that compete annually in the national competition.

The league was established in 1988 to create a top tier national rugby league competition in Tonga after several scattered leagues existed in areas of the country previously and a combined national competition was deemed better for the national side and Tongan rugby league in general.

With the establishment of the TNRL the Tonga national rugby league team now each year contains several players whom currently play in the domestic competition, the 2006 national team contained both Simione Foliaki and Taufa Fukofuka from the Vaini Doves and the Mu'a Saints.

The 2013 TNRL competition was won by the Kolomua Warriors who defeated Haakame Broncos at Teufaiva Stadium, Nuku'alofa.

Teams

First Division
The following twelve clubs competed in the Tongan rugby league championship during the 2022 season.

Committee

See also

Rugby league in Tonga
Tonga National Rugby League
Tonga national rugby league team
Tonga women's national rugby league team

References

External links
Official websites
Tonga National Rugby League Online

News sites
Matangi Tonga Online
Tonga Broadcasting
League Unlimited

Rugby league in Tonga
Sports leagues established in 1988
Sports competitions in Tonga
1980s establishments in Tonga
Oceanian rugby league competitions